Andy King is an American politician. A Democrat, he is the former Council Member for the 12th district of the New York City Council, which includes the Baychester, Co-op City, Edenwald, Eastchester, Wakefield, and Williamsbridge sections of The Bronx. King and his wife, Neva Shillingford-King are the founders of the Bronx Youth Empowerment Program (YEP). King was expelled from the City Council on October 5, 2020.

Life and career
A native of The Bronx and a graduate of Evander Childs High School, King attended Midwestern State University on a basketball scholarship, and eventually transferred to William Paterson University. After graduating with a Bachelor of Arts degree in communications, King worked as a NYC Child Protective Caseworker. In 2007 King became the Bronx Lead Organizer for 1199SEIU/GNYHA Healthcare Education Project (HEP).

In early 2015 King was accused by a former staffer, that she was wrongfully fired after refusing his alleged sexual advances. However, no formal court charges have been filed to date. It has also been found that King has failed to make child support payments.

In November 2015, King was fined for unlawfully using campaign funds for personal use, including several expenditures for his wife's personal expenses. King also "charged his campaign $3,568.70 for a Verizon phone line at his home address, despite billing a separate office phone line to the campaign". This was in addition to previous fines he had received in 2012 for other finance misappropriation.

Following an investigation by the New York City Council Committee on Ethics and Standards, King was expelled from the Council, with a vote of 48 in favor and 2 opposed.

New York City Council
King initially ran for New York City Council in 2009, but lost in the Democratic primary to incumbent Larry Seabrook. However, when Seabrook resigned in 2012 following a scandal, King won the special election to replace him.

He went on to win a full term in 2013, easily rolling back primary challengers and winning nearly 96% of the vote in the general election. In 2015, Council Speaker Melissa Mark Viverito named King the Chair on the Subcommittee on Libraries.

In October 2020, King was expelled, in what The New York Times called "a stunning rebuke ... the first time in the city's history that a council member was expelled in a vote by colleagues." Voting 48-2, the council expelled King based on four charges, including harassment, discrimination, and conflict of interest.

Electoral history

References

External links 

 

African-American people in New York (state) politics
Living people
Midwestern State University alumni
New York City Council members
New York (state) Democrats
Place of birth missing (living people)
William Paterson University alumni
Politicians from the Bronx
21st-century American politicians
1962 births
21st-century African-American politicians
20th-century African-American people
African-American New York City Council members
People expelled from public office